Joseph Ravindran Ratnayeke (born 2 May 1960), is a Sri Lankan businessman and former cricketer who was ODI captain of Sri Lanka national cricket team. Ratnayeke played 22 Tests and 78 ODIs from 1982 to 1990, his Test best bowling performance of eight wickets for 83 runs at Jinnah Stadium (Sialkot) Pakistan was a Sri Lankan Test record at the time, and was also vice captain to Arjuna Ranatunga.

He left Sri Lankan citizenship in 1990 and is now Australian.

Ratnayeke was described by Cricinfo writer Johann Jayasekera as able "to bowl with a lively pace and move the ball in favourable conditions", and also as "a competent batsman".

Education
He was educated at St. Anthony's College, Kandy and later moved to Trinity College Kandy.

Domestic career
Ratnayake made his debut in first class cricket for Sri Lanka Under–25s against Tamil Nadu Under–25s in 1980–81. Opening the bowling with Ashantha de Mel, Ratnayeke took three wickets, and impressed the Sri Lankan selectors enough to go on tour of England in 1981. Playing six of Sri Lanka's fifteen matches on tour, Ratnayeke took nine wickets, five of which came in one match against Sussex.

When Sri Lanka played their first Test match in February 1982, against England, Ratnayeke did not feature in the XI, though Wisden Cricketer's Almanack said after the series that leaving Ratnayeke out "gave their captain an unbalanced attack in which only De Mel was more than medium pace".

International career
He did play a tour match for the Sri Lanka Board President's XI, taking five wickets for 120, and when Sri Lanka went to Pakistan the following month, he played the first and third Tests and all three ODIs. Ratnayeke was said to "improve as the tour progressed" by Wisden, though he was noted as a bowler who gave little support to Sri Lanka's main three. Ratnayeke took three of Sri Lanka's seven wickets in the final Test at Lahore, which Sri Lanka lost by an innings and 120 runs, and also the wicket of Zaheer Abbas in the second ODI, which Sri Lanka won on scoring rate.

After cricket
Ratnayeke retired from cricket at the age of 30, at the end of the 1989–90 season. Shortly after, he emigrated to Perth, Australia, where he played grade cricket. He and his family later moved to Melbourne, where he gained a job with Amcor, a packaging company. Ratnayeke currently lives in Rowville, Victoria, with his wife and two children, and holds Australian citizenship.

References

External links

Sri Lankan cricketers
1960 births
Living people
Sri Lanka Test cricketers
Sri Lankan cricket captains
Sri Lanka One Day International cricketers
Cricketers at the 1987 Cricket World Cup
Kandurata cricketers
Lincolnshire cricketers
Nondescripts Cricket Club cricketers
Alumni of Trinity College, Kandy
Alumni of St. Anthony's College, Kandy
Cricketers from Colombo
Sri Lankan emigrants to Australia
Sinhalese sportspeople
Australian businesspeople
Australian cricketers
People who lost citizenship